The French Cup is an international, multi-level synchronized skating competition, held annually in Rouen, France. Held for the first time in 1994, the competition is organized by Fédération française des sports de glace and sanctioned by the International Skating Union.

Medalists

Senior teams

Junior teams

References

External links
 Official website of the French Cup

French Cup event pages
 2010 French Cup results
 2011 French Cup results
 2012 French Cup results 

Synchronized skating competitions
International figure skating competitions hosted by France
Recurring sporting events established in 1994